Mykonos may refer to:
 Mykonos, a Greek island in the Aegean Sea
 Mykonos restaurant assassinations, a restaurant in Berlin, Germany, where several Iranian Kurdish opposition leaders were assassinated
 Mykonos (song), a song by the band Fleet Foxes